A Society Sensation is a 1918 American silent comedy-drama film directed by Paul Powell and starring Carmel Myers and Rudolph Valentino (credited as Rudolpho De Valentina). It was released by Universal Pictures under their imprint Bluebird Photoplays. When it was re-released in 1924, it was cut down to 24 minutes to include mostly scenes that feature Valentino, although it was Carmel Myers who originally starred in the film.

Cast
Carmel Myers as Sydney Parmelee
Rudolpho De Valentina as Dick Bradley
Lydia Yeamans Titus as Mrs. Jones
Alfred Allen as Captain Parmelee
Fred Kelsey as Jim
ZaSu Pitts as Mary
Harold Goodwin as Timmy

References

External links

1918 films
1918 comedy-drama films
American silent feature films
American black-and-white films
Paul Powell
Universal Pictures films
Lost American films
1910s English-language films
1910s American films
Silent American comedy-drama films